Coyote Springs is a development outside of Flagstaff, Arizona, built in cooperation with the Museum of Northern Arizona.  The development was begun in 1997, and sits on 47 acres, and contains 19 "ritzy" properties.  The first home was built in 1998.  By 2000, it was considered "Flagstaff's premier community", with each property sitting on one to five acres, and all kept in a similar style to the Colton House, the original home on the property which was restored and also sits on the property.  The Colton House serves as "a residential facility for guests of the museum; an intimate retreat center ... and a location for private receptions."

References

Flagstaff, Arizona